Hibino Station is the name of two train stations in Japan:

 Hibino Station (Aisai, Aichi)
 Hibino Station (Nagoya, Aichi)